Buga, formally Guadalajara de Buga, is a city and municipality in the Valle del Cauca Department of Colombia.  It is famous for its Basilica del Señor de los Milagros, which houses an image of Christ called el Señor de los Milagros ("the Lord of the Miracles").

Buga is a city with a cattle industry.

History

Guadalajara de Buga, which is the city's formal name, is one of the oldest cities in Colombia; founded in 1555 by Giraldo Gil de Estupiñán under the order of the Spanish conquistador Sebastián de Belalcázar and known as Buga la Real ("the Royal Buga" ) or La Ciudad Señora (“the Lady City”). It was the home of many wealthy families coming from Spain and settling in the New World.

King Philip II of Spain gave Guadalajara de Buga its city status officially at the end of the 16th century and also granted its coat of arms for the many services rendered to the crown. During colonial era, Buga was in the Royal Audience of Quito, initially part of the Viceroyalty of Peru, and from 1739 until the creation of the Republic of La Gran Colombia, part of the Viceroyalty of Nueva Granada. After the dissolution of the Gran Colombia, it became part of the Republic of Nueva Granada (modern-day Colombia, since the newly created Ecuador, successor of the Royal Audience of Quito, did not summon representatives from Cauca to its first congress.

During the years of Independence, Simón Bolívar, called el libertador ("the liberator”), visited the city on two occasions, for which commemoration plates were placed.

American Airlines Flight 965 crashed into a mountain near Buga on 20 December 1995.

In 2013, Buga became the first municipality in the Valle del Cauca department to be named a Pueblo Patrimonio (heritage town) of Colombia. As of March 2021, it remains both the southernmost and westernmost town in the Pueblo Patrimonio network.

Culture
Currently the city receives over 3 million pilgrims per year to visit the Basilica of The Lord of the Miracles.

There is the cultural centre (Casa de la cultura) that offers art and literary training. It is an old-style house located on 6th Street 11-11, open since 1962. Buga is also famous for "The Holy Water Ale Brewing Company," one of the only hostel, microbrewery combination destinations in South America. Run by Colombian/German staff the Hostel can provide service in 3 different languages.

The city is also host to the NGO Instituto Mayor Campesino (IMCA) that assists in the development of farming communities.

Twin city
 Guadalajara, Castile-La Mancha, Spain

References

External links 

Guadalajara de Buga 

Municipalities of Valle del Cauca Department
Populated places established in 1570
Populated places established in 1573
1570 establishments in the Spanish Empire